The 2015 Chorley Borough Council election took place on 7 May 2015 to elect members of Chorley Borough Council in England. This was on the same day as other local elections.

Results Map

Council make-up

Election result

Ward results

Adlington and Anderton ward

Astley and Buckshaw ward

Chisnall ward

Chorley East ward

Chorley North East ward

Chorley North West ward

Chorley South East ward

Chorley South West ward

Clayton le Woods and Whittle-le-Woods ward

Clayton le Woods North ward

Clayton le Woods West and Cuerden

Coppull ward

Eccleston and Mawdesley ward

Euxton South ward

Lostock ward

References

2015 English local elections
May 2015 events in the United Kingdom
2015
2010s in Lancashire